Far Skies Deep Time is the first official studio EP by the English progressive rock band Big Big Train. It was released in 2010 by English Electric Recordings, and re-released in 2011 with "Kingmaker" replacing "Master of Time" as the first track. It contains five tracks, including a 17-minute epic about the last voyage of Belgian singer Jacques Brel.

Track listing
"Master of Time" (Anthony Phillips) - 7:44 / "Kingmaker" (Greg Spawton) - 10:31 *
"Fat Billy Shouts Mine" (Spawton) - 6:34
"British Racing Green" (David Longdon/Spawton) - 3:59
"Brambling" (Longdon/Spawton) - 5:00
"The Wide Open Sea" (Longdon/Spawton) - 17:44
* The original version of the EP features "Master of Time", a cover of an Anthony Phillips song demoed for the 1977 album The Geese and the Ghost. The import and download version features "Kingmaker" as an alternative track to "Master of Time".

Personnel
David Longdon – lead vocals, flute, accordion, mandolin, banjo, vibraphone, keyboards, glockenspiel, percussion, theremin
Dave Gregory – 6- and 12-string electric guitars, e-bow
Gregory Spawton –  keyboards, 6- and 12-string electric and acoustic guitars, bass guitar
Andy Poole – bass guitar, bass pedals, keyboards
Nick D'Virgilio –  drums, backing vocals, percussion

Guest musicians
Jonathan Barry – guitar solo (2)
Danny Manners – double bass (3)
Tony Müller – piano (3)
Martin Orford – keyboard solos (2)
Jim Trainer – artwork, seagulls
Rob Aubrey – mixing and mastering at Aubitt Studios

External links
Liner notes

References

Big Big Train albums
2010 EPs